J P Rooney (John Paul) is a Gaelic footballer from County Louth, Ireland. He plays with the Louth and Naomh Máirtín teams. He was part of the Louth team that played in the final of the Leinster Senior Football Championship in 2010, but were beaten in controversial circumstances by Meath. He helped Louth to win both Tommy Murphy Cup and National League Div 2 tiles in 2006. JP is Naomh Máirtín's most well known player and in 2000 he won the  Drogheda Independent/Drogheda Concentrates Sportstar of the Year. He has since retired from playing for Louth GAA but still plays for Naomh Máirtín. He has taken up a role as an underage coach for Louth GAA where he coaches teams under the age of 18.

References

1979 births
Living people
Louth inter-county Gaelic footballers
Naomh Mairtin (Louth) Gaelic footballers